The Durgeon is a 42.4 km river in Haute-Saône in Franche-Comté, eastern France. It rises in Genevrey and flows generally west to join the Saône at Chemilly. The town Vesoul is situated on its banks.

References

Rivers of France
Rivers of Bourgogne-Franche-Comté
Rivers of Haute-Saône